Charles Henry Davison (July 25, 1840 – August 26, 1896) was a merchant and political figure in Nova Scotia, Canada. He represented Lunenburg County in the Nova Scotia House of Assembly from 1876 to 1878 as a Liberal member.

Early life and education
He was born in Mill Village, Queens County, Nova Scotia, the son of Edward Doran Davison and Desiah Mack, and was educated in Sackville, New Brunswick.

Career
Following his schooling, he entered his father's lumber business. Davison was elected to the provincial assembly in an 1876 by-election held after Mather Byles DesBrisay was named a county judge. He became the senior member of the lumber company upon his father's death in 1894; he died less than three years later.

Personal life
In 1873, he married Annie Foster.

References 
 

1840 births
1896 deaths
Nova Scotia Liberal Party MLAs
People from Queens County, Nova Scotia
Lyell Medal winners